Peter Cormack (born 8 June 1974 in Liverpool) is an English-born Scottish former professional footballer who played as a defender. His father is former Liverpool player Peter Cormack senior.

Life and playing career
Cormack was born in Liverpool during his father's time with the Merseyside club. Following his father's return to Scotland, Cormack jr. started his career at the start of the 1990s with Edinburgh club Meadowbank Thistle, making two league appearances. He signed for Newcastle United but failed to make a first-team appearance and returned to Scotland in 1994 with Greenock Morton. Cormack was part of the Scottish Second Division-winning side in his first season, and he went on to make over seventy league appearances before loan spells at Raith Rovers and Stirling Albion at the end of his Morton career in 1999. After signing for Clydebank on a short-term deal at the start of 1999-00, he left to join Ross County, where he spent the second part of the season. Two-year spells with Stenhousemuir and Albion Rovers followed before a year out of the senior game with Bo'ness United. Cormack returned to senior football in 2005 with Arbroath on a short-term deal, which proved to be his last club.

He now owns a successful wealth management business in Edinburgh and is co-owner of a national sports management business called Quantum Sport.

Honours

Morton
Scottish Second Division: 1
 1994-95

References

External links

1974 births
Living people
Scottish footballers
Scottish Football League players
Livingston F.C. players
Newcastle United F.C. players
Greenock Morton F.C. players
Raith Rovers F.C. players
Stirling Albion F.C. players
Clydebank F.C. (1965) players
Ross County F.C. players
Stenhousemuir F.C. players
Albion Rovers F.C. players
Bo'ness United F.C. players
Arbroath F.C. players
Scottish Junior Football Association players
English people of Scottish descent
Footballers from Liverpool
Association football defenders